This list ranks buildings in Uruguay that stand at least 80 metres tall.

Tallest buildings

See also
 List of tallest buildings in South America

Notes

References

Tallest
Uruguay
Uruguay